Diego Euclídes de Angulo Lemos (12 November 1841 in Popayán – 14 February 1917 in Funza) was a Colombian soldier and lawyer who later entered politics and became President of Colombia in 1908.

References

External links

 :es:Diego Euclides de Angulo Lemos

Presidents of Colombia
Presidential Designates of Colombia
1841 births
1917 deaths
Colombian military personnel
People from Popayán